Trimethyltryptamine may refer to:

 α,N,N-Trimethyltryptamine
 2,N,N-Trimethyltryptamine
 5,N,N-Trimethyltryptamine
 7,N,N-Trimethyltryptamine